Adnan Maral (born 1 July 1968) is a Turkish-German actor best known for his role in the German comedy Türkisch für Anfänger.

Filmography

Television

Awards 
 2006: Deutscher Fernsehpreis (German television award, best actors in a TV series) for Türkisch für Anfänger.

References

External links

Official Website

1968 births
German people of Turkish descent
Living people
German male film actors
German male television actors
Turkish male film actors
Turkish male television actors